Andrew "The Barron" Von Etter (1940–1967) was a Boston mobster and an associate of loanshark Edward "Wimpy" Bennett and brothers James "Jimmy the Bear" Flemmi and Stephen "The Rifleman" Flemmi.

Born in Palanga, Lithuania, Andrew's immigrated with his parents to the United States in 1947. He soon became involved in criminal activity and, in 1962, was eventually arrested for safecracking while working as a part-time security guard. He would also be arrested in Dearborn Square, Roxbury that same year, an area controlled by Edward "Wimpy" Bennett, Stephen Flemmi and Vincent Flemmi. During his trial he claimed his great-grandfather General Sebastian von Etter a distinguished fighter in 1871 after the Russo-Turkish War (1877–1878), and his father was of German nobility back in his homeland.

In February 1967, shortly after the disappearance of Edward Bennett, Von Etter also disappeared. Police eventually found his body stuffed in the trunk of his 1965 Mustang after receiving an anonymous tip of an abandoned vehicle on the Medford-Somerville line. Although he had a rope around his neck, his death was thought to have been attributed to either two gunshot wounds or blunt trauma to the head (possibly by a tire iron).

Indicted on bank fraud charges with William Waugh and Earl Smith, who had earlier been involved in a failed attempt on the life of mobster Edward "Punchy" McLaughlin, authorities believed his death may have been in connection to the ongoing gang war with the McLaughlin Brothers and the Winter Hill Gang.

External links
WhiteyWorld.com - Andrew Von Etter

1940 births
1967 deaths
People murdered in Massachusetts
Murdered American gangsters
American people of German descent
Soviet emigrants to the United States
People from Palanga